Cyprinion mhalensis is a species of ray-finned fish in the genus Cyprinion. It is endemic to the eastern part of the Sarawat Mountains in Saudi Arabia where it occurs in the upper reaches of wadis. It has been recorded from shallow, permanent and slow running water, as well as intermittent streams.

Footnotes 

 

mhalensis
Fish described in 1983
Taxobox binomials not recognized by IUCN